Michał Cieślak (born 9 December 1974 in Dąbrowa Tarnowska) is a Polish politician who is a member of the VIII and IX Sejm. He is a member of Agreement. He represents the Nr. 33 (Kielce) constituency.  

Since 6 October 2020 he is a Minister without portfolio responsible for Local Government Affairs.

References 

Living people
1974 births
People from Dąbrowa Tarnowska
Members of the Polish Sejm 2019–2023
Members of the Polish Sejm 2015–2019